This is a list of child actors from the United Kingdom. All actors are aged 17 and under. When they turn 18, they legally become adults and are no longer listed as child actors, and will be moved to the List of British former child actors. For estimating an actor's age at the time of shooting, note that the years of release are given.

A
 Benjamin Evan Ainsworth (born 2008)

B
 Ella Bright (born 2006)

C
 Keira Chansa (born 2013)
 Raffiella Chapman (born 2007)
 Alfie Clarke (born 2007)
 Frankie Corio (born 2010)

D
 Pixie Davies (born 2006)

E
 Dixie Egerickx (born 2005)

F
 Amelia Flanagan (born 2008)

G
 Roman Griffin Davis (born 2007)

H
 Jude Hill (born 2010)
 Florence Hunt (born 2007)

J
 Felix Jamieson (born 2007)
 Billy Jenkins (born 2007)
 Isla Johnston (born 2007)

L
 Bleu Landau (born 2005)

N
 Jordan Nash (born 2007)
 Woody Norman (born 2009)

R
 Alexander James Rodriguez (born 2007)

S
 Nathanael Saleh (born 2006)
 Isabella Sermon (born 2006)
 Tamara Smart (born 2005)
 Amelie Bea Smith (born 2011)

T
 Kaylan Teague (born 2006)
 Will Tilston (born 2007)

V
 Xia Vigor (born 2009)

W
 Daisy Waite (born 2005)
 Indica Watson (born 2010)
 Ivy Wong (born 2012)

Y
 Archie Yates (born 2009)

United Kingdom, current
 List
British child actors

nl:Lijst van kindsterren